is a Japanese football player.

Career
Takuya Hashiguchi joined J1 League club Kashiwa Reysol in 2017. On May 31, he debuted in J.League Cup (v Hokkaido Consadole Sapporo).

Club statistics
Updated to 22 February 2018.

References

External links
Profile at Machida Zelvia
Profile at Kashiwa Reysol

1994 births
Living people
Ryutsu Keizai University alumni
Association football people from Miyazaki Prefecture
Japanese footballers
Japan Football League players
J1 League players
J2 League players
J3 League players
Kashiwa Reysol players
FC Machida Zelvia players
Tegevajaro Miyazaki players
FC Gifu players
Association football defenders